Solin may refer to:

Places
 Solin, Croatia, a town in Dalmatia
 Solin (river), a tributary of Loing river in Loiret, France

People
 Egil Solin Ranheim (1923-1992), a Norwegian politician for the Labour Party
 Ilmari Solin (1905-1976), Finnish chess player
 Tim Solin (born 1958), American curler, 1998 Winter Olympics participant
 Tony Solin, a former Australian rules footballer and political aspirant

Other
 Solin (crop), a mutant strain of flax